Suhodoll i Epërm (in Albanian) or Gornji Suvi Do (in Serbian: Горњи Суви До) is a village in the municipality of Mitrovica in the District of Mitrovica, Kosovo. According to the 2011 census, it has 224 inhabitants, all of whom are Albanians.

See also 
 Mitrovica Lake
 Mitrovica, Kosovo

Notes

References 

Villages in Mitrovica, Kosovo